The Kadiwéu are an indigenous people of Brazil.  In 1998, they lived in four villages, with some families living independently in the jungle.  They are known for their horse riding skills.

Name
Their name is now spelled "Kadiwéu" in Portuguese (plural Kadiwéus). The Kadiweu are also known as the Cadiguebo, Cadioeo, Caduveo, Caduvéo, Caduví, Cayua, Guaicuru, Kadiveo, Kadivéu, Kadiweu, Kaduveo, Kaiwa, or Mbayá-Guaikurú.

Language
They are a branch of the Guaycuru peoples and speak the characteristic Kadiweu language that belongs to the Guaicuruan  language family.  They are the last surviving group of Mbayá peoples.

Territory
The Kadiweu today live in the Kadiweu Indigenous Land, a large reserve established in 1903, in the Brazilian state of Mato Grosso do Sul in the municipality of Porto Murtinho, between the Serra de Bodoquena and the Nabileque and Aquidavão rivers.

History
The Kadiweu are the largest surviving branch of the Mbayá people. The Mbayá were raiders in the 18th century and numbered 4,000, but smallpox and influenza radically decreased their population at the end of the 18th century.
 
During the War of Triple Alliance of 1865–1870, the Kadiweu fought against Paraguay on the side of Brazil.

Notes

External links
Kadiwéu artwork, National Museum of the American Indian

Indigenous peoples in Brazil
Indigenous peoples of Eastern Brazil